Petrovce nad Laborcom is a village and municipality in Michalovce District in the Košice Region of eastern Slovakia.

History
In historical records the village was first mentioned in 1254.

Geography
The village lies at an altitude of 118 metres and covers an area of 10.217 km².
It has a population of about 980 people.

Ethnicity
The population is about 99% Slovak in ethnicity.

Culture
The village has a small public library and a football pitch.

Transport
The village has a small railway station and two bus stops.

The village lies on the main road between Michalovce and Humenné, with regular bus services between the two towns.

Gallery

External links

http://www.statistics.sk/mosmis/eng/run.html
http://www.obecpnl.eu

Villages and municipalities in Michalovce District